The Pleasant Valley Ranger Station, known also as Pleasant Valley Administrative Site and Young Ranger Station, in Tonto National Forest near Young, Arizona was built in 1919.  It was listed on the National Register of Historic Places in 1993 for its architecture.

It was designed by architects of the United States Forest Service, who employed Bungalow/Craftsman style.

It also has association with the Civilian Conservation Corps.

References

Park buildings and structures on the National Register of Historic Places in Arizona
Residential buildings completed in 1919
Buildings and structures in Gila County, Arizona
1919 establishments in Arizona
National Register of Historic Places in Gila County, Arizona